Delta Farce is a 2007 American war comedy film directed by C. B. Harding and stars Bill Engvall, Larry the Cable Guy, DJ Qualls and Danny Trejo. The first film after the Blue Collar Comedy Tour concert films to star both Engvall and Larry the Cable Guy, the title is a play on the Delta Force, one of the United States Army's elite special operations units alongside the Army Rangers and the Green Berets. It was released by Lionsgate on May 11, 2007 to extremely negative reviews.

Plot 
Larry, Bill, and Everett are three friends who each have their own shares of misfortune: Larry was a waiter who lost his job after attempting to publicly propose to his girlfriend Karen; who turned out to be cheating and got pregnant by the other man; causing him to insult a customer. Bill is living off a slip and fall lawsuit settlement, but is almost constantly berated by his wife over their living conditions and implied to be unable to divorce due to his wife having blackmail against him, and Everett is an inept security guard who was fired after only four days as a police officer, after crashing his car at a nail salon. The three are members of the United States Army Reserve, although their duties in the reserve consist mostly of drinking and partying at the reserve center once a month.

However, with manpower shortages from the Iraq War, the three find themselves called to active duty to be deployed to the occupation of Fallujah. The hard-nosed Sergeant Kilgore is assigned to prepare them for activation and deployment. After a very brief period of training, they are loaded on a C-130 transport plane bound for Iraq.

During a thunderstorm over northern Mexico, the transport pilots dump some of their cargo to reduce their load. Unfortunately, the three were asleep in the Humvee that was dropped and Sergeant Kilgore was pulled out along with the cargo as he was seeing where his men had gone. When the three wake up, seeing only desert around them, they believe they have arrived in Iraq. Sergeant Kilgore is knocked unconscious in the landing. The three believe he is dead and bury him in a very shallow grave, then proceed to drive off to search for insurgents and members of Al-Qaeda to attack. Shortly after they leave, Sergeant Kilgore regains consciousness, quickly climbs out of the very shallow grave and pursues his clueless subordinates.

The three soldiers quickly find themselves in the small village of La Miranda, believing they are helping the town fight off terrorists and insurgents. The village of La Miranda is being plagued by the attacks of a bandit gang led by Carlos Santana. Chasing away the bandits with a show of firepower, they become heroes to the villagers and capture a bandit to interrogate. Meanwhile, Sergeant Kilgore follows along the path of his subordinates, encountering significant misfortune.

While enjoying the hospitality of La Miranda, the men eventually realize they are in Mexico, not Iraq. Realizing the potential trouble they are in, the three men decide to return the favor to the villagers by helping them improve the village. Later, Bill sneaks away from town to call home and talk to his wife, while Larry and Everett prepare for the bandits to return. Bill is captured by Santana's gang and, in a showdown in La Miranda, Larry and Everett recover him and chase Santana and his men away; although Sergeant Kilgore, who arrived at precisely the wrong moment, is captured by Santana.

The three soldiers then decide to deal with Santana and his men by following them to their hideout, where Santana's men engage in bizarre entertainment like forcing kidnapped comedians to perform for them and holding lucha libre matches. Everett distracts them by posing as a luchador while Larry and Bill rescue Sergeant Kilgore. Sergeant Kilgore and Bill then plant dynamite in their trucks while Larry rescues Everett as his distraction wears off. The group escapes as the bandits' trucks explode.

Mustering everything they have to destroy the village of La Miranda, Santana and his bandits ride into town on horseback, escorting a World War II surplus Sherman tank. The group manages to incapacitate the tank with a vintage cannon and rally the townsfolk to resist the bandits.

At that moment, military helicopters come over the horizon and a large number of American soldiers storm the town. Bill's wife has been calling the Pentagon and telling anyone who would listen about the three being stranded in Mexico, until they finally began searching for the group and found them. The State Department has arranged for a cover-up to call the entire mishap "Operation Sombrero", a U.S. anti-terrorism operation done with the (retroactive) permission of the Mexican government and Santana's gang labeled as terrorists.

In the end, all four receive the Silver Star, and Bill receives the Purple Heart for being shot in the posterior during the final battle. Sergeant Kilgore creates a successful workout program in Miami, Florida, Everett becomes a popular professional wrestler in Mexico, Bill sues the Mexican government for his injuries and uses the money to buy a house in California and Larry founds his own restaurant in Mexico and marries Maria, the daughter of La Miranda's mayor. Carlos is sent into rehab and becomes a comedian.

Cast
 Larry the Cable Guy as Private Larry McCoy
 Bill Engvall as Private Bill Little
 DJ Qualls as Private Everett Shackleford
 Keith David as Master Sergeant Kilgore
 Danny Trejo as Carlos Santana
 Marisol Nichols as Señorita Maria Garcia
 Lisa Lampanelli as Connie
 Jeff Dunham (cameo) as Ken "The Amazing Ken" (with José Jalapeño on a Stick)
 McKinley Freeman as the Airborne Soldier

Reception 

On Rotten Tomatoes it has an approval rating of 5% based on reviews from 44 critics, with an average rating of 3/10. The site's consensus states: "Too afraid to be a real satire of the Iraq War, Delta Farce instead devolves into a reprehensible, unfunny mix of slapstick, gay panic, and flatulence jokes." On Metacritic the film has a score of 17% based on reviews from 15 critics, indicating "overwhelming dislike".

John Anderson of Variety wrote: "If three of The Magnificent Seven had been Gomer Pyle, the result might have looked like Delta Farce, a movie rife with fat, fart and Fallujah jokes, but with a subcutaneous wit that has a lot to do with Iraq war fatigue.
Frank Scheck of The Hollywood Reporter said the film is in poor taste and even forgetting that, "isn't funny enough to justify its existence."
Andy Webster of The New York Times wrote: "Among the many minorities mocked are Muslims, but perhaps the people most insulted are white Southerners, who presumably are expected to embrace one whopping brain-dead metaphor."
Jack Mathews of the New York Daily News wrote: "This is a movie where the villains are the comic relief for the comedians, and where the outtakes at the end are better than the film."

References

External links 
 
 

2007 films
Films set in Mexico
Lionsgate films
Military humor in film
2000s action comedy films
2000s parody films
Films about the United States Army
2007 comedy films
2000s English-language films